Reka (also known as Brnik Creek) is a right tributary of the Pšata River in Slovenia. It is formed by the confluence of two smaller creeks flowing from the Luknja Gorge and Brezovec Gorge below Mount Krvavec. It flows south through Cerklje na Gorenjskem. South of that, it is joined by a right tributary, Ušica Creek, before it joins the Pšata River at Komenda.

References

External links
Reka Creek on Geopedia 

Rivers of Upper Carniola